San Nicola di Baraggiola is a Roman Catholic church located in the neighbourhood of Baraggiola (o Barazzola), in the town limits of Borgomanero, province of Novara, Piedmont, Italy.

History
A structure at the site is documented by the 10th century. In the 12th century, the church was linked to Augustinian eremitic monks, with an adjacent monastery. The spare-appearing church has a single nave and ends in a semicircular apse. The tall 10th-century bell-tower, which doubled as watch-tower, is a Romanesque structure with mullioned windows.

References

Churches in the province of Novara
10th-century churches in Italy
Romanesque architecture in Piedmont
Churches in Borgomanero